George S. McGill (February 12, 1879May 14, 1963) was an American politician who served as a United States senator from Kansas from 1930 to 1939. He was a member of the Democratic Party.

, McGill was the most recent Democrat to represent Kansas in the United States Senate.

Biography
Born in Lucas County, Iowa, he moved with his parents to Kansas when he was five. He graduated from Central Normal College in Great Bend, Kansas, at the turn of the century and was admitted to the state bar two years later. McGill then moved to Wichita, Kansas, where he was made deputy county attorney and then county attorney for Sedgwick County, Kansas. He was elected to the United States Senate on November 4, 1930, to replace Charles Curtis, who resigned to become vice president of the United States. Former Governor Henry J. Allen was appointed to fill the seat until a successor was elected.

In the Senate, he was the chairman of the Committee on Pensions and was particularly involved in the Agricultural Adjustment Act. He was reelected in 1932 but lost a reelection bid in 1938 and three more elections in 1942, 1948 and 1954. McGill was appointed by President Franklin D. Roosevelt as a member of the U.S. Tariff Commission, a post he held until 1954. He died in St. Francis Hospital in Wichita in 1963 and was buried in Pawnee Rock Cemetery, in Pawnee Rock, Kansas.

Kansas has elected only three Democratic U.S. senators; McGill is the only one of the three both to be elected by popular vote (as opposed to election by the State Legislature) and to serve more than one six-year term, the others being John Martin and William Thompson. , McGill was the last Democrat to serve in the U.S. Senate from Kansas; the state has been exclusively represented in the Senate by Republicans since 1939, the longest such active streak for either party in the country.

Sources 

 House Transcript
 Kansas: A Cyclopedia Bio
 "Kansas' McGill", Time. September 12, 1938.

External links
 

1879 births
1963 deaths
People from Lucas County, Iowa
Democratic Party United States senators from Kansas
Kansas Democrats
Politicians from Wichita, Kansas
District attorneys in Kansas
International Trade Commission personnel
Kansas lawyers